Ganjeh is a village in Varzaq Rural District, in the Central District of Faridan County, Isfahan Province, Iran. At the 2006 census, its population was 1,146, in 293 families.

References 

Populated places in Faridan County